The 1912 United States Senate elections in Arizona took place  in the Arizona State Legislature on March 27, 1912, confirming the selection of Marcus A. Smith and Henry F. Ashurst as the state's first U.S. Senators. Their results were pre-determined on the basis on the results of a popular vote taken on December 12, 1911. 

This marked the first U.S. Senate elections held in the state after it was admitted to the union as the 48th state on February 14, 1912. The two men were sworn in on April 2.

The Seventeenth Amendment to the United States Constitution established the direct election of United States senators in each state. The amendment supersedes Article I, §3, Clauses 1 and 2 of the Constitution, under which senators were elected by state legislatures. The amendment was proposed by the 62nd Congress in 1912 and became part of the Constitution on April 8, 1913, on ratification by three-quarters (36) of the state legislatures.

Class 1

Henry F. Ashurst was elected to the Territorial House of Representatives in 1897. He was re-elected in 1899, and became the territory's youngest speaker. In 1902, he was elected to the Territorial Senate. In 1911, Ashurst presided over Arizona's constitutional convention. During the convention, he positioned himself for a U.S. Senate seat by avoiding the political fighting over various clauses in the constitution which damaged his rivals.

Class 3

Marcus A. Smith announced his candidacy for one of Arizona's two senate seats on September 24, 1911.  As the campaign began, Smith abandoned his long standing conservative stand and declared himself a "Progressive".

See also 
 1911 United States House of Representatives election in Arizona
 1912–13 United States Senate elections

References

Sources 
 
 
 

1912
Arizona
United States Senate